Khirbet et-Tannur (Arabic: خربة التنور) is an ancient Nabataean temple situated on top of Jebel Tannur, in today's Jordan. Based on the cults statues iconography, whether the temple was dedicated to the fertility goddess Atargatis and Zeus-Hadad, or perhaps other gods of their own in that form is not yet certain. The only inscription which mentioned a deity was in reference to the Edomite god Qos, who was the equivalent of the Arab god Quzah, the god of the sky.

History

The remains of Khirbet et-Tannur consists only of the temple complex on isolated mountain top, which indicate a site solely functioning as a religious high place similar to those in other Nabataean regions. While no dating is established, the temple went through three different phases. The earliest phase of the temple is usually dated around 8-7 BC on the account of an inscription engraved on a small stone block. The final phase was dated by Glueck judging from the temple's sculptures and architectural principles to about the first quarter of the second century AD. A study of ceramics, animal bones and charred plant remains has shown social memories were created through various eating and drinking practices.

References

Further reading 

 2013. J. McKenzie, J. Greene, A.T. Reyes, et al., The Nabataean Temple at Khirbet et-Tannur, Jordan,Volume 1. Architecture and Religion, Annual of the American Schools of Oriental Research 67.
 2013. J. McKenzie, J. Greene, A.T. Reyes, et al., The Nabataean Temple at Khirbet et-Tannur, Jordan,Volume 2. Cultic Offerings, Vessels, and Other Specialist Reports, Annual of the American Schools of Oriental Research 68.

External Links
Photos of Khirbat et-Tannur at the American Center of Research
Judith McKenzie's photos of Kirbet et-Tannur at the Manar al-Athar photo archive

Nabataean architecture
Archaeological sites in Jordan
Nabataean sites in Jordan